Masamba  is a small river town and district (kecamatan) in the North Luwu Regency of South Sulawesi Province of Indonesia which serves as the seat of the regency. The town lies on the Patikala River. It is served by Andi Jemma Airport.
Much of the land in the region is swampy coastal plains with mangroves found in its shallow waters. 

A population of Bugis who are known to be Muslims come from Masamba. A number of these Islamic Bugis moved out of the village into Rompo in the 1940s and into the lowlands of the region into Tabalu and Saatu in the 1950s and 1960s. Rattan trading and making is said to be important to the local economy. Coconuts are also grown near the coast in this region of Sulawesi.

Climate
Masamba has a tropical rainforest climate (Af) with moderate rainfall in September and October and heavy to very heavy rainfall in the remaining months.

References

Populated places in South Sulawesi
Districts of South Sulawesi
Regency seats of South Sulawesi